Phalacroseris is a monotypic genus of flowering plants in the family Asteraceae containing the single species Phalacroseris bolanderi, which is known by the common name Bolander's mock dandelion.

Description
Phalacroseris is a perennial herb with fleshy herbage growing from a woody caudex. The leaves are located around the base of the plant, growing up to 20 centimeters long and linear to somewhat lance-shaped. The inflorescence reaches up to 35 centimeters tall and is topped with a head filled with many golden ray florets. There are no disc florets. The fruit is a hairless, speckled, four-angled achene about 3 millimeters long. There is usually no pappus, but some achenes have vestigial pappus structures on their flat tops.

Distribution
It is endemic to the Sierra Nevada of California, where it grows in wet habitat such as moist meadows, bogs, and clearings in subalpine coniferous forest.

References

External links
 Jepson Manual Treatment - Phalacroseris
 USDA Plants Profile; v
 Flora of North America
 Phalacroseris - Photo gallery

Cichorieae
Monotypic Asteraceae genera
Endemic flora of California
Flora of the Sierra Nevada (United States)